The Federal Inventory of Heritage Sites (ISOS) is part of a 1981 Ordinance of the Swiss Federal Council implementing the Federal Law on the Protection of Nature and Cultural Heritage.

Sites of national importance

Types
The types are based on the Ordinance and consolidated/translated as follows:

References

External links
 ISOS
 Heritage sites
 

Heritage registers in Switzerland
Switzerland geography-related lists
Lists of tourist attractions in Switzerland